The 2002–03 Alabama Crimson Tide men's basketball team (variously "Alabama", "UA", "Bama" or "The Tide") represented the University of Alabama in the 2002–03 college basketball season. The head coach was Mark Gottfried, who was in his fifth season at Alabama. The team played its home games at Coleman Coliseum in Tuscaloosa, Alabama and was a member of the Southeastern Conference. This was the 91st season of basketball in the school's history. The Crimson Tide finished the season 17–12, 7–9 in SEC play, lost in the first round of the 2003 SEC men's basketball tournament. They were invited to the NCAA tournament but lost in the first round.

Roster

Schedule and results

|-
!colspan=12 style=|Exhibition

|-
!colspan=12 style=|Non-conference regular season

|-
!colspan=12 style=|SEC regular season

|-
!colspan=12 style=| SEC tournament

|-
!colspan=12 style="background:#990000; color:#FFFFFF;"|  NCAA tournament

See also
2003 NCAA Division I men's basketball tournament
2002–03 NCAA Division I men's basketball season
2002–03 NCAA Division I men's basketball rankings

References

Alabama
Alabama Crimson Tide men's basketball seasons
2002 in sports in Alabama
Alabama Crimson Tide
Alabama